The 2021–22 UEFA Europa Conference League knockout phase began on 17 February with the knockout round play-offs and ended on 25 May 2022 with the final at the Arena Kombëtare in Tirana, Albania, to decide the champions of the 2021–22 UEFA Europa Conference League. A total of 24 teams competed in the knockout phase.

Times are CET/CEST, as listed by UEFA (local times, if different, are in parentheses).

Qualified teams
The knockout phase involved 24 teams: the 16 teams which qualified as winners and runners-up of each of the eight groups in the group stage, and the eight third-placed teams from the Europa League group stage.

Europa Conference League group stage winners and runners-up

Europa League group stage third-placed teams

Format
Each tie in the knockout phase, apart from the final, was played over two legs, with each team playing one leg at home. The team that scored more goals on aggregate over the two legs advanced to the next round. If the aggregate score was level, then 30 minutes of extra time was played (the away goals rule was not applied). If the score was still level at the end of extra time, the winners were decided by a penalty shoot-out. In the final, which was played as a single match, if the score was level at the end of normal time, extra time was played, followed by a penalty shoot-out if the score was still level.

The mechanism of the draws for each round was as follows:
In the draw for the knockout round play-offs, the eight group runners-up were seeded, and the eight Europa League group third-placed teams were unseeded. The seeded teams were drawn against the unseeded teams, with the seeded teams hosting the second leg. Teams from the same association could not be drawn against each other. Since the identity of the Group G runners-up was not known at the time of the draw (due to the match between Tottenham Hotspur and Rennes not being played as scheduled), and could be either Tottenham Hotspur or Vitesse, they could not be drawn against Leicester City or PSV Eindhoven.
In the draw for the round of 16, the eight group winners were seeded, and the eight winners of the knockout round play-offs were unseeded. Again, the seeded teams were drawn against the unseeded teams, with the seeded teams hosting the second leg. Teams from the same association could not be drawn against each other.
In the draws for the quarter-finals and semi-finals, there were no seedings, and teams from the same association could be drawn against each other. As the draws for the quarter-finals and semi-finals were held together before the quarter-finals were played, the identity of the quarter-final winners was not known at the time of the semi-final draw. A draw was also held to determine which semi-final winner was designated as the "home" team for the final (for administrative purposes as it was played at a neutral venue).

Schedule
The schedule was as follows (all draws were held at the UEFA headquarters in Nyon, Switzerland).

Bracket

Knockout round play-offs

The draw for the knockout round play-offs was held on 13 December 2021, 14:00 CET.

Summary

The first legs were played on 17 February, and the second legs were played on 24 February 2022.

|}

Matches

Marseille won 6–1 on aggregate.

PSV Eindhoven won 2–1 on aggregate.

Slavia Prague won 6–4 on aggregate.

2–2 on aggregate. PAOK won 5–3 on penalties.

Leicester City won 7–2 on aggregate.

Bodø/Glimt won 5–1 on aggregate.

Partizan won 3–1 on aggregate.

Vitesse won 3–2 on aggregate.

Round of 16

The draw for the round of 16 was held on 25 February 2022, 13:00 CET.

Summary

The first legs were played on 10 March, and the second legs were played on 17 March 2022.

|}

Matches

Marseille won 4–2 on aggregate.

Leicester City won 3–2 on aggregate.

PAOK won 3–1 on aggregate.

Roma won 2–1 on aggregate.

PSV Eindhoven won 8–4 on aggregate.

Slavia Prague won 7–5 on aggregate.

Bodø/Glimt won 4–3 on aggregate.

Feyenoord won 8–3 on aggregate.

Quarter-finals

The draw for the quarter-finals was held on 18 March 2022, 15:00 CET.

Summary

The first legs were played on 7 April, and the second legs were played on 14 April 2022.

|}

Matches

Roma won 5–2 on aggregate.

Feyenoord won 6–4 on aggregate.

Marseille won 3–1 on aggregate.

Leicester City won 2–1 on aggregate.

Semi-finals

The draw for the semi-finals was held on 18 March 2022, 15:00 CET, after the quarter-final draw.

Summary

The first legs were played on 28 April, and the second legs were played on 5 May 2022.

|}

Matches

Roma won 2–1 on aggregate.

Feyenoord won 3–2 on aggregate.

Final

The final was played on 25 May 2022 at the Arena Kombëtare in Tirana. A draw was held on 18 March 2022, after the quarter-final and semi-final draws, to determine the "home" team for administrative purposes.

Notes

References

External links

3
February 2022 sports events in Europe
March 2022 sports events in Europe
April 2022 sports events in Europe
May 2022 sports events in Europe